The La Crosse–Onalaska Metropolitan Statistical Area, as defined by the United States Census Bureau, is an area consisting of La Crosse County, Wisconsin and Houston County, Minnesota, anchored by the cities of La Crosse and Onalaska. The area is part of what is commonly referred to as the Coulee Region or 7 Rivers Region. As of the 2020 census, the MSA had a population of 139,627, and in 2021 estimates placed the total population at 139,211.

Counties
 La Crosse County Wisconsin
 Houston County, Minnesota

Communities

Places with more than 50,000 inhabitants
 La Crosse, WI (Principal city)

Places with 5,000 to 10,000 inhabitants
 Holmen, WI
 La Crescent, MN
 Onalaska, WI
 West Salem, WI

Places with 1,000 to 5,000 inhabitants
 Bangor, WI
 Caledonia, MN
 Spring Grove, MN

Places with fewer than 1,000 inhabitants
 Brownsville, MN
 Eitzen, MN
 Hokah, MN
 Houston, MN
 Rockland, WI

Unincorporated places
 Barre Mills, WI
 Burns, WI
 Campbell, WI
 Farmington, WI
 French Island, WI
 Greenfield, WI
 Hamilton, WI
 Holland, WI
 Medary, WI
 Mindoro, WI
 Shelby, WI
 Stevenstown, WI
 Washington, WI

Population

Cities

Primary
Onalaska was promoted as a principal city of the MSA when the Office of Management and Budget revised the definitions of metropolitan statistical areas in 2013.

See also
 Wisconsin statistical areas

References

External links
La Crosse County
Houston County

La Crosse, Wisconsin
La Crosse County, Wisconsin
Houston County, Minnesota